The following are the members of the Dewan Undangan Negeri or state assemblies, elected in the 1959 state election and by-elections. Also included is the list of the Singapore state assembly members who were elected in 1963.

Perlis

Kedah

Kelantan

Trengganu

Penang

Perak

Pahang

Selangor

Negri Sembilan

Malacca

Johore

Singapore

1963–1965

Notes

References

Abdullah, Z. G., Adnan, H. N., & Lee, K. H. (1997). Malaysia, tokoh dulu dan kini = Malaysian personalities, past and present. Kuala Lumpur, Malaysia: Penerbit Universiti Malaya.
Anzagain Sdn. Bhd. (2004). Almanak keputusan pilihan raya umum: Parlimen & Dewan Undangan Negeri, 1959-1999. Shah Alam, Selangor: Anzagain.
Chin, U.-H. (1996). Chinese politics in Sarawak: A study of the Sarawak United People's Party. Kuala Lumpur: Oxford University Press.
Faisal, S. H. (2012). Domination and Contestation: Muslim Bumiputera Politics in Sarawak. Institute of Southeast Asian Studies.
Hanna, W. A. (1959). Elections in Malaya: A report. New York: American Universities Field Staff. 
Hussain, M. (1987). Membangun demokrasi: Pilihanraya di Malaysia. Kuala Lumpur: Karya Bistari.
Ibnu, H. (1993). PAS kuasai Malaysia?: 1950-2000 sejarah kebangkitan dan masa depan. Kuala Lumpur: GG Edar.
Surohanjaya Pilehanraya Malaysia. (1959). Penyata pilehanraya-pilehanraya umum parlimen (Dewan Ra'ayat) dan dewan-dewan negeri, tahun 1959 bagi negeri-negeri Tanah Melayu. Kuala Lumpur: Jabatan Chetak Kerajaan.